The Central Arizona Project (CAP) is a 336 mi (541 km) diversion canal in Arizona in the southern United States.

The aqueduct diverts water from the Colorado River to the Bill Williams Wildlife Refuge south portion of Lake Havasu near Parker into central and southern Arizona. CAP is managed and operated by the Central Arizona Water Conservation District (CAWCD). It was shepherded through Congress by Carl Hayden.

Description 

The CAP delivers Colorado River water, either directly or by exchange, into central and Southern Arizona. The project was envisioned to provide water to nearly one million acres (405,000 hectares) of irrigated agricultural land areas in Maricopa, Pinal, and Pima counties, as well as municipal water for several Arizona communities, including the metropolitan areas of Phoenix and Tucson.  Authorization also was included for development of facilities to deliver water to Catron, Hidalgo, and Grant counties in New Mexico, but these facilities have not been constructed because of cost considerations, a lack of demand for the water, lack of repayment capability by the users, and environmental constraints.

In addition to its water supply benefits, the project also provides substantial benefits from flood control, outdoor recreation, fish and wildlife conservation, and sediment control. It also produces an unintended swale, further increasing local biodiversity. The project was subdivided, for administration and construction purposes, into the Granite Reef, Orme, Salt-Gila, Gila River, Tucson, Indian Distribution, and Colorado River divisions. During project construction, the Orme Division was reformulated and renamed the Regulatory Storage Division. Upon completion, the Granite Reef Division was renamed the Hayden-Rhodes Aqueduct, and the Salt-Gila Division was renamed the Fannin-McFarland Aqueduct.

The 456 billion gallons (1.4 million acre feet) of water is lifted by up to 2,900 feet by 14 pumps using 2.5 million MWh of electricity each year, making CAP the largest power user in Arizona. Lake Pleasant is used as a buffer.

The canal loses approximately 16,000 acre-feet (5.2 billion gallons) of water each year to evaporation, a figure that will only increase as temperatures rise. It loses 9,000 acre-feet (2.9 billion gallons) annually from water seeping or leaking through the concrete.

History 

The CAP was created by the Colorado River Basin Project Act of 1968, signed by US President Lyndon B. Johnson on September 30, 1968. Senator Ernest McFarland, along with Senator Carl Hayden, lobbied for the Central Arizona Project (CAP) aimed at providing Arizona's share of the Colorado River to the state. McFarland's efforts failed as senator; however, they laid a critical foundation for the eventual passage of the CAP in the late 1960s.

According to the Arizona Republic, Senator Barry Goldwater, Senator Hayden, Representative Morris Udall, US Secretary of the Interior Stewart Udall and other Arizona leaders teamed up on the successful passage of what was McFarland's intended legislation that became the CAP, "probably the state's most celebrated bipartisan achievement of the 20th century."  This act provided for the US Secretary of the Interior to enter into an agreement with non-federal interests, whereby the US federal government acquired the right to 24.3 percent of the power produced at the non-federal Navajo Generating Station, Navajo Project. The agreement also includes the delivery of power and energy over the transmission facilities to delivery points within the Central Arizona Project service area.

Construction of the project began in 1973 with the award of a contract for the Havasu Intake Channel Dike and excavation for the Havasu Pumping Plant (later renamed as the Mark Wilmer Pumping Plant) on the shores of Lake Havasu. Construction of the other project features, such as the New Waddell Dam, followed. The new and modified dams constructed as part of the project were declared substantially complete in 1994. All of the non-Native American agricultural water distribution systems were completed in the late 1980s, as were most of the municipal water delivery systems. Several Native American distribution systems remain to be built; it is estimated that full development of these systems could require another 10 to 20 years.

The Hayden-Rhodes Aqueduct, which carries water from Lake Havasu to the Phoenix area, includes three tunnels totaling 8.2 miles.

The CAP partly funded the Brock Reservoir project with $28.6 million. In return for its contribution, Arizona has been awarded  of water per year since 2016.

The CAP project brought river water to Tucson successfully, but the initial implementation was called a "debacle" by the Tucson Weekly. The river water had a different mineral mixture and flow pattern from the aquifer water, stirring up and dislodging rust in municipal water mains and house pipes.

By the end of 1993, the city of Tucson paid about $145,000 to install filters in 925 homes, lost about $200,000 in revenues by adjusting water bills, and paid about $450,000 in damages claimed by homeowners for ruined pipes, water heaters, and other appliances. The city returned some houses to groundwater, but problems remained. Zinc orthophosphate was added to coat the pipes and prevent the rust from dislodging, but the return to groundwater removed the zinc orthophosphate. The solution was a US Environmental Protection Agency-funded 'blended' water system, including automatically monitoring water quality throughout Tucson, and a website to report the water quality to the public without intervention by the Tucson Water Department.

See also 

 List of canals in the United States

References

Further reading
 August Jr., Jack L. "Water, Politics, and the Arizona Dream: Carl Hayden and the Modern Origins of the Central Arizona Project, 1922–1963," Journal of Arizona History (1999) 40#4 pp. 391–414

External links 

CAP: Central Arizona Project
Overview map
Alternate photo of the canal
Roy Elson Oral History Interviews

Aqueducts in the United States
Buildings and structures in Maricopa County, Arizona
Canals in Arizona
Colorado River
Buildings and structures in La Paz County, Arizona
Buildings and structures in Pinal County, Arizona
Buildings and structures in Pima County, Arizona
Buildings and structures in Mohave County, Arizona
1968 establishments in Arizona
Interbasin transfer